Raymond Francis Newman (born June 20, 1945) is a former Major League Baseball left-handed pitcher for the Chicago Cubs in 1971 and the Milwaukee Brewers in 1972-1973.

He saw limited action in his brief career, usually as a reliever. He became known for riding a bicycle to Wrigley Field. On one occasion, he was struck by a driver and was unable to pitch that day due to the mishap. Cubs manager Leo Durocher was not amused, and Newman was traded by the next spring. Durocher, talking about his team that year, referred to "this nut who used to ride a bicycle to the ballpark."

Newman was traded from the Brewers to the Detroit Tigers for Mike Strahler at the Winter Meetings on December 6, 1973.

References

External links

1945 births
Living people
Baseball players from Indiana
Batavia Trojans players
Chicago Cubs players
Cocoa Rookie League Tigers players
Evansville Triplets players
Lakeland Tigers players
Major League Baseball pitchers
Military personnel from Indiana
Milwaukee Brewers players
Quincy Cubs players
San Antonio Missions players
Sportspeople from Evansville, Indiana
Tacoma Cubs players
Tiburones de La Guaira players
American expatriate baseball players in Venezuela
Treasure Valley Cubs players